Under the Jasmin Tree is an album by American jazz group the Modern Jazz Quartet featuring performances recorded in December 1967 and released on the Apple label. The album was the fourth release on the Beatles' new label and the MJQ were the only jazz act to record for Apple.

Reception
The Allmusic review stated: "The program is more or less standard, poised, painstakingly structured, gently swinging MJQ fare, the group's contrapuntal interplay as telepathic as ever".

Track listing
All compositions by John Lewis.

Side one
 "The Blue Necklace" – 4:52   
 "Three Little Feelings (Part I)" – 3:48   
 "Three Little Feelings (Part II)" – 4:59   
 "Three Little Feelings (Part III)" – 5:18

Side two
"Exposure" – 9:17   
 "The Jasmin Tree" – 5:10

Personnel
Milt Jackson - vibraphone
John Lewis - piano
Percy Heath - double bass
Connie Kay - drums, finger cymbals, percussion

References

Apple Records albums
Modern Jazz Quartet albums
1968 albums
Albums with cover art by Alan Aldridge